Eulima chionea is a species of sea snail, a marine gastropod mollusk in the family Eulimidae. The species is one of a number within the genus Eulima.

Distribution
This marine species occurs in the following locations:
 European waters (Atlantic Ocean)

Description 
The maximum recorded shell length is 2.4 mm.

Habitat 
Minimum recorded depth is 4950 m. Maximum recorded depth is 4950 m.

References

 Gofas, S.; Le Renard, J.; Bouchet, P. (2001). Mollusca. in: Costello, M.J. et al. (eds), European Register of Marine Species: a check-list of the marine species in Europe and a bibliography of guides to their identification. Patrimoines Naturels. 50: 180-213

External links
 Bouchet, P. & Warén, A. (1986). Revision of the Northeast Atlantic bathyal and abyssal Aclididae Eulimidae, Epitonidae (Mollusca, Gastropoda). Bollettino Malacologico. suppl. 2: 297-576

chionea
Gastropods described in 1986